Siri Keul is a Norwegian handball goalkeeper. She played 54 matches for the Norway women's national handball team between 1970 and 1976.  She participated at the 1971, 1973 and 1975 World Women's Handball Championship.

References

Year of birth missing (living people)
Possibly living people
Norwegian female handball players
20th-century Norwegian women